Jessica Lise Brouillette (born 12 June 1995) is a Canadian freestyle wrestler. At the 2019 Pan American Wrestling Championships held in Buenos Aires, Argentina, she won the silver medal in the women's 65 kg event. In 2020, she won the bronze medal in the 62 kg event at the Pan American Wrestling Championships held in Ottawa, Canada.

In 2016, she won one of the bronze medals in the women's 63 kg event at the World University Wrestling Championships held in Çorum, Turkey.

Achievements

References

External links 
 

Living people
1995 births
Place of birth missing (living people)
Canadian female sport wrestlers
Pan American Wrestling Championships medalists
20th-century Canadian women
21st-century Canadian women